Ranulf of Chester can refer to : 

Ranulf le Meschin, 3rd Earl of Chester (d. c. 1129) 
Ranulf de Gernon, 4th Earl of Chester (d. c. 1153) 
Ranulf de Blondeville, 6th Earl of Chester (c. 1172–1232)